David Jackson (born 1958) is professor of Russian and Scandinavian art histories at the University of Leeds. He is a specialist in the art of Ilya Repin on whom he wrote his PhD thesis.

Selected publications
 Nordic Art. The Modern Breakthrough 1860-1920. Hirmer Verlag, Munich, 2012. 
 The Peredvizhniki Pioneers of Russian Painting. Nationalmuseum, Stockholm, 2011. 
 Christen Købke: Danish Master of Light. Yale University Press, 2010. 
 Akseli Gallen-Kallela: The Spirit of Finland. NAI, Netherlands, 2006. (With P. Wageman)
 The Russian vision: the art of Ilya Repin. BAI, Schoten. 2006
 Akseli Gallen-Kallela: the spirit of Finland. Groninger Museum, 2006. (With P. Wageman) 
 The Wanderers and critical realism in nineteenth-century Russian art. Manchester University Press, Manchester, 2006.
 Het Russische Landschap. BAI Schoten, 2003. Exhibition catalogue. (With P. Wageman)
 Russian landscape. BAI, Schoten, 2003. Exhibition catalogue. (With P. Wageman)

References

External links 
David Jackson talking about Russian realism.

Academics of the University of Leeds
British art historians
Historians of Russian art
Alumni of the University of Wales
Alumni of the University of Edinburgh
Living people
1958 births